Time in Iraq is given by Arabia Standard Time (AST) (UTC+03:00). Iraq does not currently observe daylight saving time.

References

Iraq